The Director of Cost Assessment and Program Evaluation (CAPE) is a principal staff assistant and advisor to the Secretary and Deputy Secretary of Defense in the Office of the Secretary of Defense. The postholder, as chartered under United States Department of Defense Directive 5141.1 in 1996 (subsequently superseded and canceled with the publication of United States Department of Defense Directive 5105.84, Director of Cost Assessment and Program Evaluation (DCAPE)), provides independent analytic advice to the Secretary of Defense on all aspects of the Department of Defense (DoD) program, including alternative weapon systems and force structures, the development and evaluation of defense program alternatives, and the cost-effectiveness of defense systems. The office also conducts analyses and offers advice in a number of related areas, such as military medical care, school systems for military dependents, information technology, and defense economics. Consistent with its advisory role, the office has no decision authority or line responsibilities.

The Director of CAPE reports directly to the Secretary of Defense and the Deputy Secretary of Defense. As a political appointee, the Director of CAPE is an Executive Service Level IV official who is nominated by the president of the United States and confirmed by the United States Senate. He or she coordinates and exchanges information with other Office of the Secretary of Defense officials, the Heads of the DoD Components, and Federal officials having collateral or related functions.

CAPE's staff of approximately 155 people includes a combination of government civilians and military officers and is augmented by contractor support. The military officers serve in two- to three-year rotational assignments with the organization. CAPE's civilian staff is drawn from a variety of academic disciplines, including physics, economics, engineering, mathematics, biology, and computer science. The CAPE staff is recognized as among the most capable in the Pentagon.

This office was most previously known as the Office of Program Analysis & Evaluation (PA&E). However, PA&E was made defunct by the Weapon Systems Acquisition Reform Act of 2009.

Officeholders

The table below includes both the various titles of this post over time, as well as all the holders of those offices.

References